The Caproni Ca.53 was an Italian prototype light bomber built in the last months of World War I.

Design
The Ca.53 was a single-engine, two-seat triplane with triple glazing and fixed undercarriage. The fuselage, of rectangular section, was made of a wooden structure covered with plywood panels and characterized by the presence of two open tandem cabins, the front reserved for the pilot and the rear for the tail gunner, the latter also equipped with a lower ventral position. Integrated into the structure were the compartment and the device to launch bombs. Posteriormente it ended in a classic mono-fletching drift characterized by a single horizontal plane braced by a pair of "V" rods on each side. The upper wing was mounted high parasol, the middle wing was mounted high on the fuselage, and the lower wing was mounted low on the fuselage; all the wings were equipped with ailerons and connected to each other by three uprights on the side integrated with steel cables. 

The landing gear was fixed, mounted on a tubular structure underneath the fuselage, equipped with large diameter wheels and a mechanical device that had been lapped and integrated laterally by a support shoe positioned under the tail.

Development
In 1917, the Royal Military Aviation Technical Directorate issued a specification for the supply of a new bombing aircraft capable of carrying a 400 kg war load in bombs at a speed of 200 km/h. Giovanni Battista Caproni responded with a triplane design with a classic, single engine propeller design with wooden structure covered in plywood and treated canvas, characterized by the triple gliding suitable for light bombardment, fast aerial reconnaissance and hunting.

The Ca.53 was completed in 1918 and first flew that same year at the Taliedo airfield. The model, which in its first phase of development was equipped with different engines, aroused the interest of the US and British armed forces. The installation of a more powerful 700 bhp Fiat A.14 engine (515 kW) was also envisaged, with which it was expected to reach a top speed of 240 km/h. However, probably due to the need to give priority the construction of the large bombers and disappointing performance, the Ca.53 did not enter production.
 
After WW1, Caproni proposed two civilian derivatives of the Ca.53, the four-passenger Ca.54 airliner and the Ca.55 floatplane. However, those projects remained on the drawing board due to the serious downturn in the aviation market after WW1.

Specifications

See also

References

Further reading

 

Ca.053
1910s Italian bomber aircraft
Triplanes
Aircraft first flown in 1918